E. foliatus may refer to:
 Ephebopus foliatus, West et al., 2008, a spider species in the genus Ephebopus and the family Theraphosidae found in Guyana
 Ethobunus foliatus, Goodnight & Goodnight, 1983, a harvestman species in the genus Ethobunus and the family Zalmoxidae found in Costa Rica

See also
 Foliatus (disambiguation)